Huang Wenzhuo (born 9 January 1999) is a Chinese footballer currently playing as a midfielder for Xinjiang Tianshan Leopard.

Career statistics

Club
.

References

1999 births
Living people
Chinese footballers
Association football midfielders
China League One players
Shanghai Port F.C. players
Xinjiang Tianshan Leopard F.C. players